Heinrich Rudolf Wullschlägel (1 February 1805, Sarepta, Saratov Governorate, Russian Empire (now part of Volgograd) – 29 March 1864, Berthelsdorf, Germany) was born in the Moravian Colony of Sarepta in Russia and was a  Dutch-German bishop, botanist and translator.

Wullschlägel received his primary education in Niesky, Saxony, his theological instruction in Gnadenfeld, Silesia, spent the years 1844-47 on Antigua, 1847-49 in Jamaica, and 1849-1855 in Paramaribo, Surinam as head of the Mission of the Unitas Fratrum - The Moravian Church.

Wullschlägel made extensive botanical collections and wrote a dictionary of the Creole language there, as well as on a trip to the Mosquito Coast. 
He entered the directorate of the Moravian Church in Berthelsdorf near Herrnhut in 1855 and became its bishop in 1857.

 Wullschlaegelia Reichenbach fil., a genus of two species of leafless orchids bears his name.

Some species named after him 
 Tabernaemontana wullschlaegelii
 Anthurium wullschlaegelii
 Philodendron wullschlaegelii
 Somphoxylon wullschlaegelii
 Lepanthes wullschlaegelii
 Paspalum wullschlaegelii
 Psychotria wullschlaegelii
 Pilea wullschlaegelii

Sources 
 Urban, Ignaz, Notae Biographicae, Symbolae Antillanae 3:145,1902.

Bibliography 
 Complete bibliography - WorldCat

1805 births
1864 deaths
People from Volgograd
People from Tsaritsynsky Uyezd
19th-century Moravian bishops
Russian people of German descent
Russian people of Dutch descent
Emigrants from the Russian Empire to Germany
Moravian Church missionaries
German people of the Moravian Church
Dutch people of the Moravian Church
German Protestant missionaries
19th-century German botanists
Dutch Protestant missionaries
19th-century Dutch botanists
Linguists from the Netherlands
Translators from German
Translators to Dutch
Botanists active in the Caribbean
Botanists with author abbreviations
19th-century translators
Protestant missionaries in Antigua and Barbuda
Protestant missionaries in Jamaica
Protestant missionaries in Suriname
Missionary botanists
Missionary linguists